Manfred Gustav Raupp (born 13 November 1941 Staffort, a suburb of Stutensee) is a German
agricultural scientist and economist. He is honorary professor of the Czech University of Life Sciences Prague active in the Department of Agricultural Research and International Management. 
He is a member of the management team of the EU research project Biofector as a specialist in 
agricultural- and biological-informatics, responsible for training and information.

Life and work
After studying agricultural technology, agricultural science, sociology, economics and marketing 
at the Engineering College in Nuertingen, the University of Hohenheim and at INSEAD he worked in Market Theory in Hohenheim  and Bad Duerkheim. Having obtained diplomas in engineering (FH) and agriculture he obtained a doctorate (Dr. oec) in 1973 in Hohenheim.

From 1974 to 1999 he was a senior manager in the Swiss concern Ciba-Geigy, responsible for seed products, and by Novartis, where he was responsible for the agrochemical business in Central and East Europe, as well as for Central Asia. Since 1999 he has an independent business in agricultural research and research and consulting.

Manfred Raupp is a registered EU advisor for the EU Commission in agro-research matters, in particular Bio-Effectors, and performs teaching duties at the Universities of Prague-Suchdol, Chester, Erdine and Timişoara. He carries out research and teaches on the themes: plant vitalization and resource management, Bio-Effectors, the natural product industry, resistance to plant disease and international management.

Further commitments 
In the 1970s he was a founder member of the Renewable Raw Materials group of Manfred Dambroth which built up the German Gene Bank of Crop Plants and with Ludwig Reiner was involved in the establishment of German agricultural informatics.

In 1987 Raupp was active in support of Polish small farmers with blizzard maize seed. In 1989 he was invited to teach Agricultural Research and International Management in German and English at the University of Prague-Suchdol, and in 2000 became a member of the editorial board of the scientific journal Scientia Agriculturae Bohemica Prague. Since the beginning of the Erasmus programme he has been involved in international student exchange and in Rotarian youth exchange, and is a member of the Regional Committee Germany-Turkey of Rotary International.

He is active as a Guest Lecturer within the framework of the Erasmus relationship between Trakya University and the University of Chester on the one hand, and DHBW Loerrach on the other. Together with Mukadder Seyhan Yuecel he prepared the Loerrach Symposium at Trakya University. He also campaigned for the recognition of the Selimiye Mosque in the UNESCO list of World Culture heritage.

Herr Raupp was a founder of the German BioValley, was a founder member of the Trinational School Research Centre phaenovum and is Chairman of Loerrach International.

Selected publications
Macharzina, Klaus & Michael-Jörg Oesterle (Editors) Handbook of International Management; Contribution Manfred G. Raupp, Management-related and Organisational Requirements of Export Strategy, Hohenheim University; (Gabler 1997/2002), .
Leadership, Persuasion and Sales; a Basis for Study and Everyday Life. Frieling and Partner Publishing Berlin 2003 
BW Cooperative State University; an innovative system of higher education; Balkan Conference Edirne 2010
Family History Book of Staffort, Published by the town of Stutensee, Verlag Gesowip Basel 2010, 
Loerrach Symposium; 5 Years of College and Culture Partnership Loerrach-Erdine, Loerrach 2011 
Enver Duran; Professor of Medicine and Reetor of Trakya University 2004-2012, Lörrach 2012 
Together with Mukadder Seyhan Yücel: The Key of Success in Business and Personal Development is Language Competence, Loerrach 2012 
Together with Bärbel Bouziane: Lörrach and the Elysee Friendship, Lörrach 2013 
Together with Peter Lepkojis: The German-Turkish Care Project Lörrach-Edirne; Information for German-Turkish Exchange of Carers, Loerrach 2013 
Zur Entwicklung der Agrarforschung im Laufe der Zeit, Überlegungen im Zusammenhang mit dem Einsatz von Bioeffektoren, Lörrach, 
Zum früheren Tabakanbau der Hardt und seiner historischen Einordnung; Eine Darstellung der regionalen und weltweiten Bedeutung, Stutensee, September 2016 
Zu den Innovationen im landwirtschaftlichen Pflanzenbau und Aspekte für die menschliche Ernährung gestern, heute und morgen, Lörrach, August 2016 
Together with Peter Hartman: Agrarlexikon mit den wichtigsten Begriffen zur Landwirtschaft im Europäischen Umfeld; Bedeutung in deutscher und englischer Sprache erklärt. 
The fight against Malaria and Other related Mosquito-born Diseases, University Prishtina, Rotary International Workshop Mai 2019 
Biofector Research Document, The Use of Bio-Effectors for Crop Nutrition, March 2020 
Biofector Herbarium Raupp, April 2020

Awards 
Honorary Professor of  the Czech University of Prague 2003
Paul Harris Fellow Medaille of Rotary International 2011
Appointment as Guest Professor of Chester University 2012
Honorary Citizen of Edirne 2015

References

External links 
Manfred G. Raupp on the webpage of Madora GmbH, Germany
Webpage of the University of Hohenheim
Webpage of Loerrach-International

Living people
German agronomists
1941 births